Stob Binnein is a mountain in the southern Highlands of Scotland, near Crianlarich. It forms a twin-peak with Ben More 3,852 ft (1,174 m), from which it is separated  by the Bealach-eadar-dha Beinn, meaning pass between two hills.

Stob Binnein is often climbed in conjunction with Ben More by means of the Bealach-eadar-dha Beinn. Descent may be made from the bealach direct to Benmore Burn. It may also be climbed from the south, starting near Inverlochlarig, some 8 km from Balquhidder. A route of about 5 km climbs from the glen, following the mountain's southern ridge over the intervening minor summits of Stob Invercarnaig and Stob Coire an Lochain.

See also 
 Ben Nevis
 List of Munro mountains
 Mountains and hills of Scotland

References

Munros
Marilyns of Scotland
Mountains and hills of the Southern Highlands
Mountains and hills of Stirling (council area)
One-thousanders of Scotland